ACD was the first CD from Half Man Half Biscuit. It featured some of the tracks from the previous vinyl album, Back Again in the DHSS.

Track Listing
"The Best Things In Life"
"D'Ye Ken Ted Moult?"
"Reasons To Be Miserable (Part 10)"
"Rod Hull Is Alive – Why?"
"Dickie Davies Eyes"
"The Bastard Son Of Dean Friedman"
"I Was A Teenage Armchair Honved Fan"
"Arthur's Farm"
"Carry On Cremating"
"Albert Hammond Bootleg (live)"
"Reflections In A Flat (live)"
"Sealclubbing (live)"
"Architecture And Morality, Ted And Alice (live)"
"Fuckin' 'Ell It's Fred Titmus (live)"
"Time Flies By (When You're The Driver Of A Train) (live)"
"All I Want For Christmas Is A Dukla Prague Away Kit (live)"
"The Trumpton Riots (live)"

References 

Half Man Half Biscuit albums
1989 albums